Károly Szittya (June 18, 1918 – August 9, 1983) was a Hungarian swimmer and water polo player who competed in the 1948 Summer Olympics and in the 1952 Summer Olympics. He played in Újpesti Dózsa 1930–1947, and Ferencvárosi TC 1948–1954. He was born in Budapest and died in Szeged.

Szittya was part of the Hungarian team which won the silver medal in the 1948 tournament. He played six matches and scored six goals. Four years later he was a member of the Hungarian team which won the gold medal in the Olympic tournament. He played three matches and scored five goals.

After his active sport career he was a water polo coach in Hungary and Cuba. In 1969 he became a member of the Hungarian Olympic Committee and received a Master Coach Award.

See also
 Hungary men's Olympic water polo team records and statistics
 List of Olympic champions in men's water polo
 List of Olympic medalists in water polo (men)

References

External links
 

1918 births
1983 deaths
Hungarian male water polo players
Water polo players at the 1948 Summer Olympics
Water polo players at the 1952 Summer Olympics
Olympic gold medalists for Hungary in water polo
Olympic silver medalists for Hungary in water polo
Water polo players from Budapest
Medalists at the 1952 Summer Olympics
Medalists at the 1948 Summer Olympics
20th-century Hungarian people